Henry Lemoine may refer to:

 Henry Lemoine (1786-1854), French piano teacher, music publisher, composer
 Henry Lemoine (writer) (1756–1812), English writer

See also
 Henri Lemoine (disambiguation)